Kosmos 33 ( meaning Cosmos 33) or Zenit-2 No.20 was a Soviet, first generation, low resolution, optical film-return reconnaissance satellite launched in 1964.

Kosmos 33 was launched by a Vostok-2 rocket, serial number G15001-05, flying from Site 31/6 at the Baikonur Cosmodrome. The launch took place at 10:19 GMT on 23 June 1964, and following its successful arrival in orbit the spacecraft received its Kosmos designation; along with the International Designator 1964-033A and the Satellite Catalog Number 00816.

On 1 July 1964, after 8 days in orbit, the satellite was deorbited with its return capsule descending by parachute for recovery  by Soviet forces.

References

Kosmos satellites
Spacecraft launched in 1964
Spacecraft which reentered in 1964
Zenit-2 satellites